Sandro Bolchi (18 January 1924 – 2 August 2005) was an Italian director, actor and journalist.

Biography 
Bolchi was born in Voghera, Italy on 18 January 1924. He died on 2 August 2005 in Rome, Italy.

Background
Born in Voghera, Bolchi, who was graduated in literature, made his debut as an actor in the "Guf" theater in Trieste, an experience that continued even after he moved to Bologna, where he also began his activity as journalist and stage director.   In 1956 he made his directorial debut on television with  Frana allo Scalo Nord, since then he directed a large number of successful TV dramas, mostly based on masterpieces of nineteenth-century literature.

Selected filmography
 Red Shirts (1952)

References

External links 
 

1924 births
2005 deaths
Italian television directors
Italian male journalists
Italian theatre directors
People from Voghera
20th-century Italian journalists
20th-century Italian male writers